Leslie Sydney Dennis Morley (23 May 1924 — 16 June 2011) FRS FREng FRAeS was a Professorial Research fellow at the Brunel Institute of Computational Mathematics (BICOM) in London and the author of the book Skew plates and structures.

Awards and honours
Morley was elected a Fellow of the Royal Society (FRS) in 1992. His certificate of election reads: 

Morley was also elected a fellow of the Royal Academy of Engineering and Royal Aeronautical Society.

References

Fellows of the Royal Society
1924 births
2011 deaths